Lycée Français Blaise Pascal (LFBP) is a French international school in Abidjan, Ivory Coast. It includes the Ecole Jacques Prévert, the collège-lycée (junior and senior high school) and a scientific post-secondary preparatory school for French Grandes Écoles.

The school's gymnasium, designed by Koffi & Diabaté Architects, won an award at the 2018 World Architecture Festival for its sustainable bioclimatic design.

See also
 Jean-Mermoz International School

References

External links
  Lycée Français Blaise Pascal

Abidjan
Schools in Abidjan
High schools and secondary schools in Ivory Coast
International high schools